New Fighter-Network of Left Socialists is a left-wing political party in Greece and former member of the Coalition of the Radical Left (SYRIZA). It was founded in 2006 as a faction in Panhellenic Socialist Movement. It was formed by former members of PASOK and non-aligned socialists, who are motivated by the principles of democratic socialism. Since 2011, the New Fighter participated in SYRIZA. However, New Fighter left SYRIZA in 2015 and joined Popular Unity for the September 2015 legislative elections.

External links
Official site

Socialist parties in Greece
2006 establishments in Greece
Former components of Syriza